Fórmula, Vol. 3: La Gira (English: Fórmula, Vol. 3: The Tour) is a concert tour by American singer-songwriter Romeo Santos in support of his fifth studio album, Fórmula, Vol. 3 (2022). The tour dates and cities were announced individually through the Santos's social media. The first leg of the tour is set to begin on February 10, 2023, in Lima, Peru, and expect to end on April 22, 2023, in Buenos Aires, Argentina or on July 9, 2023, in Madrid, Spain.

Following its announcement, it broke several records on tickets sales including nine consecutive sold out shows at Movistar Arena in Santiago, Chile, and four consecutive nights at the Estadio Nacional in Lima, Peru. It is his first international tour since Golden Tour (2018) and his first concert tour overall since Inmortal Tour (2020-21) with Aventura and Utopía Tour (2019). This is also the first Formula tour since Fórmula, Vol. 2 Tour (2014-16).

Tour dates

References 

2023 concert tours
Concert tours of South America